Vermelho (Portuguese for Red) is an EP; the second and final release by Brazilian musician Vange Leonel. It came out in 1996 via independent label Medusa Records. Medusa Records was founded also in 1996, by Vange and her songwriting partner Cilmara Bedaque.

The album also counts with guest appearances by then-Titãs members Nando Reis and Charles Gavin (who were also featured on Leonel's previous album), and Edgard Scandurra, famous for his work with Ira!.

Track listing

Personnel
 Vange Leonel – vocals, rhythm guitar, production
 Nando Reis – bass guitar
 Charles Gavin – drums
 Edgard Scandurra – guitar
 Cilmara Bedaque – production

References

1996 EPs
Vange Leonel albums
Portuguese-language EPs

pt:Vermelho (álbum)